Tirumala Dhruva Bera is the name given to the deity of Lord Venkateswara in Tirumala Venkateswara Temple, Andhra Pradesh. Other terms used for Dhruva Bera include Moolavar or Moola Virat (Main Deity), Achala (Stagnant).

Tirumala Dhruva Bera is considered to be Swayambhu - self-manifested and not created by human. According to Sri Venkatachala Mahatyam, Lord Venkateswara came to reside in this sacred spot to provide blessings to devotees in the Kali Yuga. The deity does not conform to the agamas (rules) for making a deity, thus furthering the belief that the temple's deity is Swayambhu.

Deity description
The dhruva bera stands approximately ten feet tall  and stands a platform of about 18 inches. The platform follows a simple lotus design and the details of the any inscription on the platform is unknown to anyone except the temple's  (priests). The platform is usually covered in tulsi leaves except on Thursday afternoon and during Friday  abhishekam.

The face of the deity has exquisite features, with the nose neither flat nor prominent. The eyes are prominent and has the outline of 'namam' though it is not projected out of the deity. The eyes are partially covered with the namam made of pachakarpuram (raw camphor). The size, shape and details of the namam are governed by strict rules laid by the Vaikhanasa agamam. The deity has a self manifested crown up to the forehead and jatajuta (curly hair) resting on the shoulder. The chest is estimated to be between 36 and 40 inches in width and the waist would be between 24 and 27 inches, though there has never been a formal measurement of these statistics. Since the upper body is bare, features of the chest are prominently seen with the main feature being the image of a sitting Sridevi carved on the right side of the chest. The image of lakshmi is integral to the deity. The deity has 4 arms. The upper arms in the position to hold his weapons though the Chakram and Conch are not integral to the deity. The removable Sudarshana chakram is placed on the upper right arm while the Panchajanya - Vishnu's conch is placed on the upper left arm. The lower right arm is in the Varada Hasta pose - palms facing outward towards the onlooker to signal boon giving nature of the lord. The lower left arm is in the Katyavalambita pose - palm facing the lord with the thumb nearly parallel to the waist. The deity is seen with a dhoti worn waist downwards. Both the knees are slightly bent forward to indicate that the Lord is willing to come to the devotee's rescue. The shoulder of the lord has marks resembling scars made by constant wearing of bow and pack of arrows though the deity is not in the Tribhanga pose (unlike Tirumala Rama deity )

Ornaments
Tirumala Dhruva bera has a number of ornaments as seen on the deity. The yagnopavitam (sacred thread) is seen on the bare chest of the lord running from the left shoulder to the right waist. Four sets of necklaces are seen on the deity. The deity also has a two-inch katibandham (waist band)  running over the dhoti. The arms have armlets and the legs  have ornaments near the ankle. The lord sports also ear ornaments. The lord has a coin necklace.

Seva to deity

Daily seva
The lord gets complete attention during most of the rituals conducted in the garbha griha. After, the lord is woken up during the Suprabhatam Seva, Suddhi (cleansing) is done by removal of flowers from the previous day and apportionment of holy water bought from Akasa Ganga thirtam for the day's prayer. During Tomala Seva, the gold kavacham (armour) of the feet is removed and abhishekam is done daily to it. Bhoga Srinivasa, the Kautuka beram of the temple receives full abhishekam every day in lieu of the Dhruva bera. Sahasranamarchana - recital of 1,000 names of Lord Srinivasa is performed to the main deity after the completion of Tomala seva. Naivedyam (food offerings) are made thrice during the day and is preceded by recital from various scriptures. Following the first naivedyam (also called First Bell), verses from Prabandham is read. Before the mid-day and second naivedyam (also called Second Bell), Ashthottaranama (108 names of the Lord) is read and this is a private service. The rituals of Tomala Seva, Archana and Naivedyam is conducted in the evening after Malayappa swami returns from Sahasra Deepalankarana Seva and is called Night Kainkaryams. Naivedyam is offered to other deities only after apportionment of the same to the main deity.

Weekly sevas
Apart from these daily sevas, Ashtadala Pada Padmaaradhana Seva is conducted every Tuesday after the second bell. During the ceremony, the priests reads each of the 108 names of the Lord while offering a gold lotus to the feet of the lord after the recital of the name. On completion of archana for the lord's consorts, two kinds of arati is shown to the Lord. On Thursdays, Tiruppavada Seva is performed to Dhruva bera in the Tirumamani mantapam inside the sanctum sanctorum. During the seva, large quantities of pulihora (tamarind rice) heaped in trapezoidal or pyramidal shape along with sweetmeats like payasam, laddus, jilebis, appam deposited on the edges is offered to the Lord with appropriate mantras. On Fridays, Abhishekam is performed accompanied by the chanting of pancha suktas (five suktas - Purusha Suktam, Sri Suktam, Narayana Suktam, Bhu Suktam and Nila Suktam) and prabhandams.

References

Tirumala Venkateswara Temple
Tirumala Idols